Carthage Township is one of the fourteen townships of Athens County, Ohio, United States. The 2010 census found 1,532 people in the township.

Geography
Located in the southeastern part of the county, it borders the following townships:
Rome Township - north
Troy Township - east
Olive Township, Meigs County - southeast corner
Orange Township, Meigs County - south
Bedford Township, Meigs County - southwest corner
Lodi Township - west
Canaan Township - northwest corner

No municipalities are located in Carthage Township, although the unincorporated community of Lottridge lies in the township's center.

Name and history
Carthage Township was organized in 1819.

It is the only Carthage Township statewide.

Government
The township is governed by a three-member board of trustees, who are elected in November of odd-numbered years to a four-year term beginning on the following January 1. Two are elected in the year after the presidential election and one is elected in the year before it. There is also an elected township fiscal officer, who serves a four-year term beginning on April 1 of the year after the election, which is held in November of the year before the presidential election. Vacancies in the fiscal officership or on the board of trustees are filled by the remaining trustees.

References

External links
County website

Townships in Athens County, Ohio
1819 establishments in Ohio
Populated places established in 1819
Townships in Ohio